Chin Kim (born 1957) is a Korean-born American classical violinist, largely educated in the United States through the Juilliard School, and the Curtis Institute of Music.

Activities
Chin Kim performs extensively throughout the North America, Europe, and Korea as soloist with orchestras such as, the Philadelphia Orchestra, the Montreal Symphony Orchestra, Czech Philharmonic, the Atlanta Symphony Orchestra, and with both South and North Korean orchestras with conductors Leonard Slatkin, Gerhardt Albrecht, Ianzug Kakhitzhe, Myung-whun Chung, and Ling Tung. Kim also performs, gives master classes, and teaches at the Green Mountain Chamber Music Festival, the International Academy of Music Festival, and the Summit Music Festival.
He is active as soloist with orchestras, as violinist in recitals, chamber music, master classes, and as a teacher. He teaches the violin, viola, and chamber music at the Mannes College of Music New York. He is also on the violin faculty as associate professor at the Queens College, the Aaron Copland School of Music, the CUNY Doctoral program, and at the Columbia University Teacher’s College.

Reviews
His performances were quoted by the critics with comments such as; "Performing each with consummate technical ease, attractive tone, and an excellent lyrical sense. His pianist, (David Oei) displays same appealing qualities" "A gorgeous, lush tone", "Great flair and brilliance", "Transcendent technical control", "Gracefully lyrical...Infectious warmth throughout",

Competitions
Chin Kim was prizewinner in many international violin competitions including at the Concours Musical International Reine Elisabeth de Belgique (Brussels, Belgium) 1985, Concourse International de Montréal (Canada) 1983, Premio Paganini International Violin Competition (Genoa, Italy) 1990, and International Violin Competition of Indianapolis (USA) 1986.

Recordings
Chin Kim made CDs of the Tchaikovsky, Glazunov, Prokofiev 2nd Concertos, and the Prokofiev Sonata No. 2 (conductor Paul Freeman, with orchestras St. Petersburg Philharmonic, Moscow Philharmonic, and with pianist David Oei) have been released by ProArte/Intersound to high critical acclaim "Performing each with consummate technical ease, attractive tone, and an excellent lyrical sense", "Fully in command of his instrument and musically assertive. The Sonata is a superior example of perceptive chamber music collaboration", "Kim's rich, golden tone is a real treat...no doubt many great singers would envy Kim's lovingly phrased and songful performance...easy recommendation". The Starr-Kim-Boeckheler Piano Trio (with pianist Susan Starr, cellist Ulrich Boeckheler) released the Mendelssohn Piano Trio in C minor, and the Tchaikovsky Piano Trio in a minor with the Mastersound/Allegro.

Education and awards
Graduate of the Curtis Institute of Music in 1979, and subsequently from the Juilliard School1989, he was awarded the D.M.A. degree, the Petscheck award, the Kreisler award, and the Concerto Soloist award. Mr. Kim was awarded the Nan-Pa award from Korea, which is highest of honors given to a Korean-born musician. His teachers include Ivan Galamian, Dorothy DeLay, Josef Gingold, Jascha Brodsky, Felix Galimir, Sally Thomas, Kyung Wha Chung, among others, and also studied Schenkerian analysis with Dr. Carl Schachter, and Bach with Edward Aldwell.

Management
Chin Kim is exclusively managed by Gershunoff Artists, LLC.

References

External links
http://chinkim.com
http://www.musicacademyonline.com/performers/kim.php
https://web.archive.org/web/20090311002450/http://www.webconcerthall.com/interview/chin.htm
https://web.archive.org/web/20040806180348/http://www.portlandchamberorchestra.com/2004-2005%20season/Artists%20and%20Composers/chin_kim.htm
http://video.aol.com/video-detail/ravel-sonata-3rd-movement-chin-kim-violin-david-oei-piano-mannes-faculty-recital-05-11-11/2416402770/?icid=VIDLRVHOV04
https://web.archive.org/web/20080926172148/http://www.uvm.org/gmcmf/concerts/facultyseries.html
http://www.alibris.com/search/music/upc/675754552824
http://www.musicweb-international.com/classrev/2004/Nov04/Moon.htm

South Korean classical violinists
American classical violinists
American male violinists
People from Manhattan
American classical musicians of Korean descent
Curtis Institute of Music alumni
1957 births
Living people
Juilliard School alumni
Place of birth missing (living people)
21st-century classical violinists
21st-century American male musicians
Male classical violinists
21st-century American violinists